Rey is a Japanese band who signed onto the Lantis label in 2008. Front man Kenta Harada claims that their band's name comes from both Hironobu Kageyama's band Lazy and the anime character Rei Ayanami. The group's debut single under Lantis was used as the first ending theme of Tomica Hero: Rescue Fire. Rey was also included on Lantis's compilation album Gundam Tribute from Lantis, covering "Stand Up to the Victory", the first opening theme for Mobile Suit V Gundam. The band broke up as on August 31, 2013.

Members

Regular members
: Vocals and lyricist
: Bass guitar
: Guitar
: Guitar

Former members
: Drums. He withdrew from the band in October 2010.

Discography

Indie albums
Wind Gate - March 5, 2008

Albums
Rey - November 26, 2008
"Generation"

"Cha-La Head-Cha-La"
H.A.B (Hit and Break) - April 6, 2011
"Hit and Break!"
"Road to Kingdom" (PS2 Game "Desert Kingdom" Opening theme)
"RIDE OUT!" (Adeventure game "INSTANT BRAIN" Promotional song)
"LEGEND of KAISER" (Movie/OVA Mazinkaizer SKL Insert song)
" (PS2 Game "Armen Noir" Opening theme)

"AXEL TRANSFORMERS" (Anime television series "Transformers Animated" Ending theme)
"Rescue Dream!" (TV Tokusatsu Dorama "Tomica Hero: Rescue Fire" Insert song)
 (PS2 Game "Armen Noir" Ending theme)
"Alive a Soldiers"
 (PS2 Game "Desert Kingdom" Ending theme)
"BURNING HERO" (TV Tokusatsu Dorama "Tomica Hero: Rescue Fire" Ending theme)
"THANK YOU"

Singles
"Burning Hero" - June 3, 2009
C/W "Rescue Dream!"
Ending theme song for Tomica Hero: Rescue Fire
"Axel Transformers" - May 12, 2010
C/W "Alive a Soldier"
Ending theme song for Transformers Animated
"Road to Kingdom" - July 7, 2010
C/W 
Theme songs for Desert Kingdom
"MONSUNO!"" - November 28, 2012
C/W "Starting over"
Opening theme song for Juusen Battle Monsuno

Non-single tracks

From Gundam Tribute from Lantis

From Tomica Hero: Rescue Fire: Original Soundtrack

From Hanasaku Iroha: Original Soundtrack

From Anime television series/Data Cardass Aikatsu! Original Soundtrack - Aikatsu! Music!! 01

References

External links
Official website
Band blog

Japanese rock music groups